Antu County (Chosŏn'gŭl: 안도현; Hangul: 안투현) is a county of southeastern Jilin province, Northeast China. It is under the administration of the Yanbian Korean Autonomous Prefecture. Antu is home to Korean and Manchu minorities. In 2020 it had a population of 195,000, of which 17.9% Koreans. It has a border crossing with North Korea at Shuangmufeng (双目峰).

Administrative divisions
Antu has seven towns and two townships.

Towns:
Mingyue (明月镇 / 명월진), Songjiang (松江镇 / 송강진), Erdaobaihe (二道白河镇 / 이도백하진), liangjiang (两江镇 / 량강진), Shimen (石门镇 / 석문진), Wanbao (万宝镇 / 만보진), Liangbing (亮兵镇 / 량병진)

Townships:
Xinhe Township (新合乡 / 신합향), Yongqing Township (永庆乡 / 영경향)

Climate

References

External links 

County-level divisions of Jilin
Yanbian Korean Autonomous Prefecture